The 44th Annual TV Week Logie Awards was held on Sunday 28 April 2002 at the Crown Palladium in Melbourne, and broadcast on the Nine Network. The ceremony was hosted by Wendy Harmer, and guests included Frankie Muniz and Ronn Moss.

Winners and nominees
In the tables below, winners are listed first and highlighted in bold.

Gold Logie

Acting/Presenting

Most Popular Programs

Most Outstanding Programs

Performers
Shakira – "Whenever, Wherever"
Elton John – "Original Sin"
Destiny's Child – "Bootylicious"

Hall of Fame
After several years on Australian television, Mike Willesee became the 19th inductee into the TV Week Logies Hall of Fame.

References

External links
 

2002 in Australian television
2002
2002 television awards
2002 awards in Australia